In social philosophy, objectification is the act of treating a person, as an object or a thing. It is part of dehumanization, the act of disavowing the humanity of others. Sexual objectification, the act of treating a person as a mere object of sexual desire, is a subset of objectification, as is self-objectification, the objectification of one's self. In Marxism, the objectification of social relationships is discussed as "reification".

Definitions 
According to Martha Nussbaum, a person is objectified if one or more of the following properties are applied to them:
 Instrumentality – treating the person as a tool for another's purposes
 Denial of autonomy – treating the person as lacking in autonomy or self-determination
 Inertness – treating the person as lacking in agency or activity
 Fungibility – treating the person as interchangeable with (other) objects
 Violability – treating the person as lacking in boundary integrity and violable, "as something that it is permissible to break up, smash, break into."
 Ownership – treating the person as though they can be owned, bought, or sold (such as slavery)
 Denial of subjectivity – treating the person as though there is no need for concern for their experiences or feelings

Rae Langton proposed three more properties to be added to Nussbaum's list:
 Reduction to body – the treatment of a person as identified with their body, or body parts
 Reduction to appearance – the treatment of a person primarily in terms of how they look, or how they appear to the senses
 Silencing – the treatment of a person as if they are silent, lacking the capacity to speak

Arguments
Nussbaum found people's understanding of objectification too simplistic to serve as a normative concept by which people evaluate the moral implications of sexualization of women. Thus, her project is to clarify the concept by testing out the 7 dimensions of objectification and distinguish between benign and harmful forms in different circumstances in relation to sex.
Nussbaum has argued that the topic of objectification is not only important to sexuality, which has been discussed at length, but to the Marxist view on capitalism and slavery. Nussbaum argues that potentially not all forms of objectification are inherently negative acts and that objectification may not always be present when one of the seven properties is present.

Immanuel Kant believes that sexual desire is a powerful desire that is necessarily objectifying. According to his theories, sexually aroused people have an urge to take in and engulf the other person for the purpose of sexual satisfaction. This sexual desire manifest itself as a denial of autonomy which one wishes to dictate how the other person will behave, so as to secure one's own satisfaction. It is also as a denial of subjectivity that one stop asking how the other person is thinking or feeling, bent on securing one's own satisfaction. Sexual desire is so acute and powerful that it drives out other thoughts that consider the well-being of others and people start to reduce others to a set of body parts. Sexual Objectification is a general feature of sexuality that the involved parties eagerly desire both to be objectifiers and to be objects.

Catherine Mackinnon and Andrea Dworkin adopt Kant's understanding of sex as inherently objectifying but dispute that participants are objectifiers and the objectified one. They argue that objectification of men and women is asymmetrical. The way men express sexuality and the way women express sexuality are structured by a larger social and culture context and the power between men and women is unequal. Men express their sexuality in a dominant way by objectifying women while women express their sexuality in a submissive way by being objectified or by self-objectifying. Hence, women are more vulnerable to violability and lack of subjectivity and autonomy. Nussbaum argues that it is important to put male-female sexuality in a more macro-perspective in which Mackinnon and Dworkin ignore the personal histories and psychologies that are equally morally important.

Male gaze is one of the main enablers of self objectification. Social media is argued to largely enforce the self-objectification, especially in women. Women tend to internalize the perspective of others and start to perceive themselves according to these external views. The selfies of women posted on social media are from camera angles that typify male gaze perspective. The comment section enables the self-objectification more, by letting people shame or praise the picture. The likes and shares bring a sense of validation to women who post these selfies.

Feminist objectification theory 
The objectification theory as proposed by Barbara Fredrickson and Tomi-Ann Roberts states that the objectification of a woman or a girl can eventually lead to an increased feeling of anxiety or self-awareness. The woman supposedly immediately internalizes the status that the society has given to her and sees this outcome as a primary view of herself.

Fredrickson and Roberts argue that in some way, the objectification of women can even affect the mental health of the female. The perspective of the public imposed on the female body can lead to body monitoring and obsessive eating patterns which will eventually lead into an internal feeling of shame or anxiety. Fredrickson and Roberts argue that influences from the new wave feminists and scholars have put the female body in a sociocultural perspective. This has emphasised the sociocultural representation of the female body over the biological role. They argue that the one should not be overshadowed by the other, as it is the combined effect that has created a social construction behind the body image.

The objectification theory further promotes the sociocultural analysis of the female body within the psychology of women and gender. As Fredrickson and Roberts state: "Perhaps the most profound and pervasive of these experiences is the disruption in the flow of consciousness that results as many girls and women internalize the culture's practices of objectification and habitually monitor their bodies' appearance."

Intersectionality and Transgender Experiences of Objectification 
Sexual objectification experiences can vary according to an individual's intersectional identity markers. Utilizing an intersectional approach can deepen the understandings of objectification constructs pertaining to transgender identities. Transgender individuals experience unique challenges during the interpretation of their identity.

Mirella Flores argues that prior explorations into the topic of objectification have been primarily focused on the experiences of cis-gendered people. Transgender individuals have been excluded from the discourse of objectification as their expressed gender has been historically invalidated. For example, the traditional heteronormativity displayed in the field of psychology has previously enabled the conceptualization of gender non-conformity as a mental disorder. Furthermore, representations of transgender individuals in the media have portrayed them as comic relief, perpetuating transphobia, and further stigmatizing transgender individuals. Sexual orientation standards are inserted into social representations of gender as either masculine or feminine and this gender binary has been propagated through the media, peers, family, and other socio-cultural channels. Through objectification and social representation, exaggerated body image ideals associated with masculinity and femininity encourage the objectification of one's body in order to adhere to these socio-cultural appearance ideals. Although the theory of objectification was originally used to explain how the female body is reduced to its appearance, it can be used to analyze how transgender individuals approximate these ideals to be consistent with their gender.

The low level of social acceptance of transgender individuals provokes devaluation and stigmatization. Transgender individuals may internalize societal appearance ideals through body monitoring and comparison in order to legitimize their gender identity. Some transgender individuals feel as if they must adopt the binary body image and act towards it in order to fit into societal standards. Objectification ignores gender identity and categorizes individuals based on the ideal expression of gender which affects transitioned men and transitioned women. Objectification becomes a problem and solution for individuals attempting to affirm their gender identity and expression through social recognition. The ideal male physical attractiveness includes the portrayal of muscle and robustness and transgender men can attempt to conform to the standard through compulsive exercise and steroid injection. Transgender women experience similar objectification as cisgender women do according to the reduction of one's self to a mere hypersexualized body  Transgender individuals may attempt to affirm their gender identity through illegal practices such as using silicone injections that eventually results in harmful health consequences Furthermore, transgender individuals may seek gender affirmation through sex work, increasing the risk of sexually transmitted diseases. The discrepancy of appearance (e.g., height and body structure) may impede transgender individuals' alignment with their gender identity and they do not feel as if they fit the social standards even after medical interventions. Transgender individuals may internalize the negative stereotypes perpetuated through sexual objectification such as "transgender prostitute" which has been found to induce stereotype affirming behaviors. Internalization of negative stereotypes have been linked to low self-esteem, devaluation, feelings of worthlessness and in the worst case, suicide.

References

External links

 
 
 

Descriptive technique
Feminist theory
Social philosophy
Prejudice and discrimination